"Can't Shake Loose" is a 1983 song from Agnetha Fältskog's solo album, Wrap Your Arms Around Me. It was the third single release in Europe and the first to be issued in the United States and Canada.

The song was written by Russ Ballard, who also wrote the successful "I Know There's Something Going On" for Agnetha's former ABBA colleague Anni-Frid Lyngstad (Frida).

"Can't Shake Loose" proved rather successful on the U.S. Billboard Hot 100, where it broke into the Top 30 at No. 29 in November 1983, making it her only Top 40 song in that country. As usual, Fältskog did only limited promotion, although she appeared on American television in August 1983. "Can't Shake Loose" also performed well in Canada, where it reached No. 23. In the UK and Australia, however, the track proved unsuccessful, reaching No. 63 and No. 76, respectively.

Music video
Agnetha filmed a promotional video for the track, in which she portrayed a worried and nervous girlfriend of a rich and powerful man, played by Mikael Rickfors. She also drove a Porsche in the clip. The video is unusual for the time as Agnetha does not mime the lyrics to the song during the clip, with the exception of the "I don't want to stay here" bridge.

Chart positions

References

1983 singles
Agnetha Fältskog songs
Songs written by Russ Ballard
Song recordings produced by Mike Chapman
1983 songs
Polar Music singles